Benjamin Williams (January 1, 1751July 20, 1814) was the 11th and 14th Governor of the U.S. state of North Carolina, from 1799 to 1802 and from 1807 to 1808. He was the first of two North Carolina Governors since the American Revolution to serve nonconsecutive terms.

Biography
Williams was born in Johnston County, North Carolina, in 1751, and became a farmer. He married Elizabeth Jones on August 10, 1781; they had one son named Benjamin.

Williams served as a member of the revolutionary convention in Johnston County in 1774; he then served in the North Carolina Provincial Congress and two terms in the Provincial Council. In 1775, Williams was appointed to the Second North Carolina Regiment; he served until 1781, was promoted to the rank of colonel, and fought at the Battle of Guilford Courthouse. He also served in the Province of North Carolina House of Burgesses in 1775.

Military service:
 Lieutenant in the 2nd North Carolina Regiment (1775-1776)
 Captain in the 2nd North Carolina Regiment (1776-1779)
 Lt. Colonel or Colonel in the Johnston County Regiment of North Carolina militia (1780-1781)
 Lt. Colonel or Colonel over the North Carolina State Regiment (State Troops) (1781)

Williams served in the North Carolina General Assembly during the 1780s, served one term in the United States House of Representatives from 1793 to 1795, and was elected governor in 1799 to fill the unexpired term of William R. Davie, who had resigned. Williams served for three years; during his last year in office, he pardoned Congressional Representative John Stanly, who had killed former Gov. Richard Dobbs Spaight in a duel.

The State Constitution of 1776 limited the post of governor to three one-year terms within six years; Williams sought re-election to the position in 1805 but was defeated by Nathaniel Alexander. In 1807, the General Assembly elected him governor once again, but this time he served only a single term of one year. Williams then retired from politics, except for a single term in the North Carolina Senate in 1809.

Col. Williams was a Mason and was a member of St. John's Lodge in New Bern.

Williams died in 1814 and is buried in Moore County. His home called House in the Horseshoe, is a tourist attraction operated by the North Carolina Department of Cultural Resources.

References

 Biographical Directory of the Governors of the United States, 1789–1978, Robert Sobel and John Raimo, eds. Westport, CT: Meckler Books, 1978.
 NC Department of Cultural Resources

1751 births
1814 deaths
Governors of North Carolina
Members of the United States House of Representatives from North Carolina
North Carolina state senators
North Carolina Federalists
People from Johnston County, North Carolina
People from Moore County, North Carolina
Federalist Party state governors of the United States
Members of the North Carolina House of Burgesses
Members of the North Carolina Provincial Congresses